John Pyper-Ferguson (born February 27, 1964) is an Australian-born Canadian actor. He has appeared in a wide range of films and television shows. His notable works include playing Sonny Hamilton on Hamilton's Quest, Peter Hutter on The Adventures of Brisco County, Jr., and Joe Whedon on Brothers & Sisters. He also portrayed Tomas Vergis on the science fiction drama television series Caprica, Tex on the TNT television series The Last Ship, James Kendrick on Burn Notice and as Jack Soloff on USA Network's television series Suits.

Early life
John Pyper-Ferguson was born in Mordialloc, Australia, the son of 1948 and 1952 Canadian Olympic swimmer Kathleen McNamee and Canadian "Miracle Mile" runner Richard Ferguson. After a brief period in his birth place, he moved to Vancouver, British Columbia, Canada, where he was raised by his parents. He went to high school at Handsworth Secondary School, and later graduated with distinction from the University of Alberta with a Bachelor of Fine Arts in Performance.

Career

1986–1999
Pyper-Ferguson began his acting career on the prime time drama Hamilton's Quest (1986) as Sonny Hamilton. This brought about Hollywood film roles in movies such as Prom Night II (1987), Pin (1988), Ski School (1990), Bird on a Wire (1990), Stay Tuned (1992), a brief appearance in Unforgiven (1992), and Killer Image (1992).

He concurrently continued his television career with several guest appearances, including shows like Night Heat (1987), 21 Jump Street (1990) as Joshua, Bordertown (1990–1991) as August Fox and Lonny Gibbons, Neon Rider (1990–1991) as Zak and Det. Miller, MacGyver (1991), Star Trek: The Next Generation (1992), and Walker, Texas Ranger (1993).

From 1993 to 1994, John played a recurring character on The Adventures of Brisco County, Jr. as Pete Hutter. A significant moment in his career was his portrayal of Brian Cullen on Highlander (1994), for which he earned a Gemini Award-nomination, Best Performance by an Actor in a Guest Role Dramatic Series.

Subsequent television guest roles consist of his appearances on Children of the Dust (1995), Legend. (1995), Lonesome Dove: The Outlaw Years (1995), recurrences on The X-Files (1995–1997) as Paul and Det. John Kresge, Nash Bridges (1996–1998) as Zack Spears, and The Outer Limits (1996) as Brian Chason (Episode: "Falling Star"). His other credits include The Sentinel (1997), Millennium (1997–1998) as Jim Gilroy, Jake Waterston and Ben Fisher, Poltergeist: The Legacy (1997–1998), The Crow: Stairway to Heaven (1998–1999), Harsh Realm (1999), and finally Jack & Jill (1999) as Kevin (Episode: "Pseudos, Sex and Sidebars").

Filling out the rest of the decade, he appears in several feature films like Frank & Jesse (1995) as Clell Miller, Hard Core Logo (1996), For Richer or Poorer (1997), Drive (1998), and I'll Take You There (1999).

2000–present
He started appearing on the television series Arli$$ (2000), ER (2000), CSI: Crime Scene Investigation (2000–2010) as Husband and Dr. William Byrne, a recurring role on The Huntress (2000–2001) as Jake Blumenthal, The Outer Limits (2001) as Dr. Kenneth Vaughn (Episode: "Mind Reacher"), Jack & Jill (2000–2001) as Kevin (Episodes: "When You Wish Upon a Car", "Starstruck", and "California Dreamin'"), The Guardian (2001), 24 (2003), a recurring role as Gabriel Sims on Jeremiah (2003–2004), Smallville (2005), CSI: Miami (2005), Into the West (2005) as Josiah Bell, The Closer (2005), and Night Stalker (2005–2006) as Agent Bernard Fain.

In 2006, John Pyper-Ferguson joined the main cast of Brothers & Sisters as a series regular, playing the character Joe Whedon.

From 2007 to 2011, his television credits are Everest (2007) as Roger Marshall, Cane (2007) as Hudson, The L Word (2008), Cold Case (2008) as Pete Doyle, Fear Itself (2008) as Rowdy Edlund, Terminator: The Sarah Connor Chronicles (2009), Bones (2009), Mental (2009), Lie to Me (2009), Flashpoint (2009), Criminal Minds (2010), Lost (2010), White Collar (2010), Dark Blue (2010), Castle (2010), Hellcats (2011), Alphas (2011), and a performance on the science fiction series Fringe (2011), as two alternate versions of the character named John McClennan.

His film career moved on to notable movies like Pearl Harbor (2001), Black Dawn (2005), She's the Man (2006), X-Men: The Last Stand (2006), Tekken (2009), Score: A Hockey Musical (2010), A Night for Dying Tigers (2010), Conviction (2010), Born to Race (2011), and Drive (2011).

From 2005 to 2013, Pyper-Ferguson was cast in an abundance of TV shows set in the reimagined BSG universe. On the space opera thriller series Battlestar Galactica (2005–2006) he played Captain Cole "Stinger" Taylor. On its science fiction drama prequel Caprica (2010), he portrayed Tomas Vergis, the Tauron billionaire and adversary of Daniel Graystone, with whom he—on multiple occasions—goes head-to-head. He played Xander Toth in the military science fiction television pilot entitled Battlestar Galactica: Blood & Chrome.

In 2014, Pyper-Ferguson began appearing as Tex, a special forces soldier, during the first season of the TNT drama The Last Ship; in the second season, he was upped to the regular cast on the show. However, his character was killed off at the end of season three though he reprised the role briefly in the series finale. In 2015, he appeared as Jack Soloff, a recurring character on the USA Network drama Suits.

In 2017, he appeared as a guest in season four of The 100 as Bill Cadogan, the leader of the Second Dawn doomsday cult. In season seven, he reprised the role as a recurring character.

He is playing a character named Jack Jones in the upcoming film, Three Days in Havana.

Filmography

Film

Television

Awards and nominations

References

External links

1964 births
Australian male film actors
Australian male television actors
Living people
Canadian male film actors
Canadian male television actors
Canadian male voice actors
20th-century Australian male actors
20th-century Canadian male actors
21st-century Australian male actors
21st-century Canadian male actors
University of Alberta alumni
Male actors from Victoria (Australia)